The A35 is a  road linking Namibia to Sehithwa and then onto the A3 road to access Francistown. The route is notable for the amount of airports on the road.

Airports

 Shakawe Airport
 Etsha Airport
 Nxamaseri Airport
 Gumare Airport
 Nokaneng Airport
 Tsau Airport

References

Roads in Botswana